Anderson Serangoon Junior College (ASRJC) is a junior college located in Yio Chu Kang, Singapore, opposite Yio Chu Kang MRT station, offering a two-year pre-university course leading to the Singapore-Cambridge GCE Advanced Level examinations. ASRJC was formed after the merger of Anderson Junior College (AJC) and Serangoon Junior College (SRJC) in 2019.

ASRJC houses the Elementz Laboratory, the MOE North Zone Centre of Excellence for Science, and Makers Lab. The college hosts the annual Elementz International Science Research Conference and Exhibition, an event that accords recognition to students from secondary school (upper secondary levels) and Junior Colleges who have conducted scientific research to showcase their findings.

History 

On 20 April 2017, it was announced that AJC would merge with SRJC, with the merged school located at the current site of AJC. According to MOE, the choice of schools to be merged are based on geographical proximity so as to maintain a good spread of schools across the country, adding that the sites for the merged schools were chosen based on accessibility to transport and quality of infrastructure.

The merged school was named as Anderson Serangoon Junior College, which is a combination of the two schools' names, from 2019. SRJC principal, Manogaran Suppiah, became the founding principal. The merged school received its first batch of students in 2019. 

The Anderson Junior College Hostel was planned and construction commenced in 2009. The hostel was opened in 2012, but was permanently closed from 2019 as MOE announced that demand for boarding places continue to fall and there are fewer international students in schools in Singapore.

Education Minister Ong Ye Kung announced in March 2019 that ASRJC will be rebuilt at the site of former AJC campus at Yio Chu Kang. While the rebuild is underway, the college will temporarily reoccupy the campus of former SRJC. The move was initially scheduled to take place in 2022, but was delayed twice, to 2023 and finally 2024.

Principals

Identity and culture

Motto
The college motto is Discere Servire – Non Mihi Solum, which is Latin for To Learn, To Serve – Not for Myself Alone. It is a combination of the previous mottos of Serangoon JC (Discere Servire) and Anderson JC (Non Mihi Solum).

Anthem
The college anthem is titled Discere Servire – Non Mihi Solum, similar to the college motto. It was personally penned by ASRJC's first principal, Mr Manogaran Suppiah.

House system 
For competitive intra-school events, the school population is divided into four houses. These houses are based on classes, which are in turn based on the students' subject combinations:

A house committee is in charge of each house, with each house having a captain and vice-captain. The house committee is made up of student councillors.

Campus
The present Anderson Serangoon Junior College campus consists of 13 buildings (blocks). Under the JC Rejuvenation Programme, most of the present campus will be demolished and rebuilt from 2024 to 2027. During this period, ASRJC will move temporarily to the former campus of Serangoon Junior College.

Academic information 
Anderson Serangoon Junior College offers both Arts and Science courses that leads up to the Singapore-Cambridge GCE Advanced Level examinations. 

The college will be a Tamil Language Centre offering the Tamil Language Elective Programme (LEP) with effect from 2020 for students who excel in the language to pursue their passion for and interest in Tamil.

Co-curricular activities (CCAs)

References

External links
Official website
Anderson Junior College Integrated Virtual Learning Environment (IVLE)
Anderson Serangoon Junior College Portal
AJC Alumni Association

Junior colleges in Singapore
Educational institutions established in 2019
Schools in Ang Mo Kio
2019 establishments in Singapore
Education in North-East Region, Singapore